The following sortable table comprises the 184 peaks of the Rocky Mountains of North America with at least  of elevation and at least  of topographic prominence.

The summit of a mountain or hill may be measured in three principal ways:
The topographic elevation of a summit measures the height of the summit above a geodetic sea level.
The topographic prominence of a summit is a measure of how high the summit rises above its surroundings.
The topographic isolation (or radius of dominance) of a summit measures how far the summit lies from its nearest point of equal elevation.

In the Rocky Mountains, 62 major summits exceed  elevation, 137 exceed , and the following 184 exceed  elevation.



Major 3000-meter summits

Of the 401 major 3000-meter summits of greater North America, the following 184 (or 46%) are in the Rocky Mountains.

Of these 184 major 3000-meter summits of the Rocky Mountains, 116 are located in Colorado, 17 in Wyoming, 15 in Montana, 12 in Alberta, 11 in British Columbia, seven in New Mexico, five in Idaho, and four in Utah.  Three of these summits lie on the Great Divide between Alberta and British Columbia.  The 30 highest major summits of the Rocky Mountains are all located in Colorado.

Gallery

See also

Rocky Mountains
Geology of the Rocky Mountains
:Category:Rocky Mountains
commons:Category:Rocky Mountains
List of mountain peaks of North America
List of mountain peaks of Greenland
List of mountain peaks of Canada
List of mountain peaks of the Rocky Mountains
List of the major 4000-meter summits of the Rocky Mountains

List of the ultra-prominent summits of the Rocky Mountains
List of the major 100-kilometer summits of the Rocky Mountains
List of extreme summits of the Rocky Mountains
List of mountain peaks of the United States
List of mountain peaks of México
List of mountain peaks of Central America
List of mountain peaks of the Caribbean
Physical geography
Topography
Topographic elevation
Topographic prominence
Topographic isolation

Notes

References

External links

Natural Resources Canada (NRC)
Canadian Geographical Names @ NRC
United States Geological Survey (USGS)
Geographic Names Information System @ USGS
United States National Geodetic Survey (NGS)
Geodetic Glossary @ NGS
NGVD 29 to NAVD 88 online elevation converter @ NGS
Survey Marks and Datasheets @ NGS
Bivouac.com
Peakbagger.com
Peaklist.org
Peakware.com
Summitpost.org

Rocky Mountains
Rocky Mountains, List Of The Major 3000-Meter Summits Of The
Rocky Mountains, List Of The Major 3000-Meter Summits Of The
Rocky Mountains, List Of The Major 3000-Meter Summits Of The
Rocky Mountains, List Of The Major 3000-Meter Summits Of The
Rocky Mountains, List Of The Major 3000-Meter Summits Of The